Rihab Hammami (born June 4, 1989) is a Tunisian sailor. She and Hedi Gharbi placed 20th in the Nacra 17 event at the 2016 Summer Olympics.

References

1989 births
Living people
Tunisian female sailors (sport)
Olympic sailors of Tunisia
Sailors at the 2016 Summer Olympics – Nacra 17
21st-century Tunisian women